An election of the delegation from Malta to the European Parliament was held on 6 June 2009, on the same day as the 2009 Maltese local council elections.

Candidates

Alternattiva Demokratika – AD (Democratic Alternative) 
Arnold Cassola
Yvonne Ebejer Arqueros

Alleanza Liberali – ALDM (Liberal Alliance) 
John Zammit

Alpha Partit Demokratiku Liberali – APDL (Alpha Liberal Democratic Party) 

Emmy Bezzina

Azzjoni Nazzjonali – AN (National Action (Malta)) 

Josie Muscat
Malcolm Seychell
John Spiteri

Imperium Europa – IE (European Empire) 

Norman Lowell
Reuben Attard

K.U.L. Ewropa (KULE) 
Cecil Herbie Jones

Libertas Malta (LM) 

Mary Gauci

Partit tal-Ajkla – PA (Eagle's Party) 

Nazzareno Bonnici

Partit Laburista (Malta Labour Party) – PL 

Claudette Abela Baldacchino
John Attard Montalto
Glenn Bedingfield
Steve Borg
Maria Camilleri
Joseph Cuschieri
Sharon Ellul-Bonici
Louis Grech
Kirill Micallef Stafrace
Marlene Mizzi
Edward Scicluna
Christian Zammit

Partit Nazzjonalista (PN) 

Simon Busuttil
David Casa
Rudolph Cini
Alan Deidun
Edward Demicoli
Vince Farrugia
Roberta Metsola Tedesco Triccas
Alex Perici Calascione
Frank Portelli
Marthese Portelli

Results 
The turnout was 78.81%. The Partit Laburista garnered 54.77% of first-count votes and the Partit Nazzjonalista garnered 40.49%; 2.31% of votes cast were invalid. Simon Busuttil MEP was the only candidate to be elected on the first count with 68,782 (27.72%) single votes.

Elected MEPs

See also 
 European elections in Malta
 2004 European Parliament election in Malta

References 

Malta
European Parliament elections in Malta
2009 in Malta